Sinezona doliolum is a species of minute sea snail, a marine gastropod mollusk or micromollusk in the family Scissurellidae, the little slit snails.

Description
The height of the shell reaches 1 mm.

Distribution
This marine species occurs off Transkei, South Africa.

References

External links
 To Encyclopedia of Life
 To World Register of Marine Species

Scissurellidae
Gastropods described in 1986